The Suguta Valley, also known as the Suguta Mud Flats, is an arid part of the Great Rift Valley in Kenya (Africa), directly south of Lake Turkana.

Location

The Suguta valley today is one of the driest parts of Kenya, with annual rainfall below .
Lake Logipi seasonally fills a small part of the northern end of the valley. 
The Barrier Volcano, a broad volcanic complex, separates the valley from Lake Turkana.
Mount Ngiro rises to the east of the Suguta valley. 
Namarunu, a volcano active in historic times, extends into the valley from the western wall.

The belt lies between the Ngiro basement uplift to the east and the Loriu Plateau to the west, and is thicker in the eastern part. Exposed volcanic rocks include basalts, tuffs and ash formed between 4.2 and 3.8 million years ago, the products of trachytic volcanism from 3,8 to 2.6 million years ago and basaltic and alkali basaltic rocks created from that period until the present.
In the early Pliocene the least horizontal stress direction - the direction of rift expansion - was NW-SE.

Hydrology

Lake Suguta once filled the valley, at times overflowing into Lake Turkana.
The lake level rose and fell several times in the last 18,000 years due to changes of rainfall during the African Humid Period that lasted from 14,800 to 5,500 years ago.

The valley is drained by a seasonal stream, the Suguta River, which in the rainy season forms the temporary Lake Alablad, a playa lake that combines with Lake Logipi at the northern end of the valley.

Ecology

The saline waters provide food for cyano-bacteria and other plankton, which in turn are food for flamingoes.
Due to the inaccessibility and harsh climate, with high temperatures, only the most determined tourists visit the site.
 
The valley is used as a hide-out by Pokot and Turkana cattle rustlers. It is considered a "no go" region by the police due to the extremely harsh environment and familiarity of the rustlers with the terrain.

November 2012 Police Killings

In November 2012 over 40 Kenya Police officers and reservists  were killed in the Suguta Valley near Baragoi while on a mission to recover stolen cattle.

References

Sources

 
 

Great Rift Valley
Masai xeric grasslands and shrublands
Valleys of Kenya